Pedro Ruiz de la Camera was a Roman Catholic prelate who served as Auxiliary Bishop of Toledo (1524).

De la Camera was ordained a priest in the Order of Preachers. On 18 April 1524, he was appointed during the papacy of Pope Clement VII as Auxiliary Bishop of Toledo and Titular Bishop of Salona.

References

External links and additional sources
 (for Chronology of Bishops) 
 (for Chronology of Bishops) 

16th-century Roman Catholic bishops in Spain
Bishops appointed by Pope Clement VII